The James M. Inhofe National Defense Authorization Act for Fiscal Year 2023 (NDAA 2023) is a United States federal law which specifies the budget, expenditures and policies of the U.S. Department of Defense (DOD) for fiscal year 2023. Analogous NDAAs have been passed annually for over 60 years.

History
The House bill  was passed on July 14, 2022. Hearings on the Senate amendment in the House Committee on Rules were scheduled for December 4. On December 6, a political agreement was reached between the leaders of the Senate Armed Services Committee and House Armed Services Committee. President Biden signed and enacted  on December 23, 2022.

Provisions
Military funding authorized by the bill includes:
Full funding of the Ford-class carriers
Full funding of the Columbia-class ballistic missile submarines
Versions of the legislation expand the Selective Service System (military draft) to females, but it was cut in the final bill.

The NDAA requires the Secretary of Defense to rescind the directive, implemented in August 2022, that members of the U.S. armed forces be vaccinated against COVID-19. During the period the requirement was in effect, 98% of active duty service members and 96% of all service members had been vaccinated. The bill does not require reinstatement for personnel previously ejected for non-compliance with the order.

The NDAA includes provisions for reporting of unidentified flying objects (UFOs), otherwise known as unidentified aerial phenomena or UAPs, including whistleblower protections and exemptions to nondisclosure orders and agreements. It also requires the military to review UFO sightings back to 1945. Language on the topic of UAP was also included in the previous 2022 NDAA (i.e. ) as well as the accompanying committee report for the Intelligence Authorization Act for Fiscal Year 2022.

The included the Burma Unified through Rigorous Military Accountability Act of 2022 (BURMA Act of 2022) contains provisions to sanction the Burmese military junta, the State Administration Council (SAC), including cabinet members and state-owned commercial responses, in response to the 2021 Myanmar coup d'etat, and assistance to pro-democracy advocates seeking to restore civilian rule, including the parallel National Unity Government, the National Unity Consultative Council, the Committee Representing Pyidaungsu Hluttaw, the Burmese Civil Disobedience Movement. In response, the military junta issued a statement dubbing the legislation an interference in Myanmar's internal affairs, and encroachment of the country's sovereignty.

The included Taiwan Enhanced Resilience Act contains provisions for increased military aid and security cooperation. The legislation and a recent visit by the Speaker of the US House of Representatives are said to have triggered large military exercises near Taiwan.

Section 583 of this NDAA authorizes the posthumous promotion of Ulysses S. Grant to the grade of General of the Armies of the United States, equal to the rank and precedence held by General John J. Pershing in and after 1919 (ch. 56).

The Aqua Alert Act was attached as an amendment to the NDAA by Congressman Dean Phillips (MN) in July of 2022. Similar to an Amber Alert system, this amendment grants the Coast Guard the ability to create an electronic notification system with the purpose of notifying the public so that they can render aid in searches for distressed individuals on waterways.

See also

References

External links
 James M. Inhofe National Defense Authorization Act for Fiscal Year 2023 as enrolled (PDF/details) in the GPO Bills collection
  on Congress.gov

U.S. National Defense Authorization Acts
Acts of the 117th United States Congress
Government responses to UFOs
United States foreign relations legislation
Myanmar–United States relations